Nimaben Bhaveshbhai Acharya is a Member of Legislative assembly from Anjar constituency in Gujarat for its 12th legislative assembly. She previously served on the Gujarat family planning council.

Incidents 
In April 2017, Acharya was traveling to a funeral when her vehicle was attacked by unidentified males who hurled stones at it, breaking the glass of the car, but Acharya and her driver were unharmed.

Controversy 
She was indicted to one year jail term by Morbi Magistrate for buying voters with money along with ex-MLA Kanti Amrutiya during 2009 Loksabha polls.

Political Career 
Not many know that she started her political career from Indian National Congress by winning 2002 & 2007 Assembly elections on a Congress ticket. But soon in 2007, her husband and 6 corporators switched sides to Bharatiya Janata Party, Nimaben followed her husband's path soon. 

She was thrown away from Congress party in 2007 due to anti party activities when she voted for Bhairon Singh Shekhawat in presidential elections.

References

Living people
Gujarat MLAs 2012–2017
Women in Gujarat politics
Politicians from Kutch district
21st-century Indian women politicians
21st-century Indian politicians
Bharatiya Janata Party politicians from Gujarat
Gujarat MLAs 2017–2022
Year of birth missing (living people)
Gujarat politicians
Gujarat's first women speaker